Ilex macropoda is a species of flowering plant in the holly family Aquifoliaceae, native to southern China, Korea, and Japan. Local people make a tea by boiling its leaves.

References

macropoda
Flora of South-Central China
Flora of Southeast China
Flora of Korea
Flora of Japan
Plants described in 1867